Fugitives and Refugees: A Walk in Portland, Oregon is a travelogue by novelist Chuck Palahniuk.

The book alternates between autobiographical chapters, and lists of the author's favorite activities in his home city of Portland, Oregon, in the Pacific Northwest of the United States.

Palahniuk guides the reader to eviction court for evocative storytelling, a massive Goodwill charity sale for purchasing clothes by the pound, and to clubs and sexual fetish organizations.

Reception
Entertainment Weekly Noah Robischon gave the book an "A" rating and wrote, "this street atlas of the weird makes for an intoxicating trip to a place you never knew you wanted to visit."

See also
 List of travel books

References

2003 non-fiction books
American travel books
Books by Chuck Palahniuk
Culture of Portland, Oregon
Books about Oregon